is the last novel by Natsume Sōseki. It was incomplete at the time of his death in 1916. It has been translated into English twice, by V. H. Viglielmo and by John Nathan.

History

Mei An was first published in daily serialized installments in the Tokyo and Osaka editions of the Asahi Shimbun, beginning on May 16, 1916. It was the ninth and last of Sōseki's novels to be serialized by the newspaper.

In a letter to the paper's editor, Sōseki explained that because of his illness — a combination of bleeding ulcers, intestinal catarrh, and hemorrhoids — he had begun work on the novel only a week before the serialization was scheduled to begin. He also remarked that he was able to complete nine installments before the serialization was published, a lead he managed to maintain until his death on December 9, 1916.

The writing of the novel became increasingly problematic for Sōseki as his illness worsened over the year. On November 16, less than a month before his death, Sōseki confided to a pupil the toll that the writing of the novel was taking on him: "It troubles me that Mei An gets longer and longer. I'm still writing. I'm sure this will continue into the new year."

By November 21 Sōseki had become too ill to continue work on the novel. He died on December 9, leaving the novel unfinished. In total, 188 installments had been completed; a manuscript with the number "189" written in the upper right corner was found on his desk after his death. The following year, Iwanami Shoten published the 188 installments in book form. Despite being incomplete, the novel is the longest work Sōseki ever wrote, being over 200 pages longer than his I Am a Cat and approximately twice the length of his other novels.

John Nathan's translation, published by Columbia University Press, includes the illustrations by Natori Shunsen that were published with the installments of the novel in the Asahi Shimbun from May 16 to December 14, 1916.

Plot
O-Nobu suspects that her husband, Tsuda, loves another woman and tries to find out the truth. Tsuda, who cannot forget his former lover, Kiyoko, goes to a hospital for a minor operation. O-Nobu visits her and her husband’s relatives in order to get some extra financial support, since the couple are extravagant. Kobayashi, an unemployed former friend, visits Tsuda and threatens that if he does not treat him well, he will reveal Tsuda’s past to O-Nobu. Kobayashi also visits O-Nobu, but nothing happens. Tsuda’s sister visits him and tries to make him realize how he should act towards his parents. Mrs. Yoshikawa, the wife of Tsuda’s boss, also visits him and tries to make him change his attitudes. She sends him away to an onsen where Tsuda meets Kiyoko, who is now married to another man.

References

 Light and Darkness: Natsume Sōseki′s Meian, translated with an Afterword by V.H. Viglielmo, reissued by CreateSpace 2011. .
 Light and Dark: A Novel, translated with an Introduction by John Nathan, Columbia University Press 2014.

1916 novels
Novels by Natsume Sōseki
Unfinished novels